Cerium fluoride may refer to:
 Cerium(III) fluoride (cerium trifluoride), CeF3
 Cerium(IV) fluoride (cerium tetrafluoride), CeF4